This Suite for violoncello, like the Cello Concerto and the Piano Trio, came from one of Gaspar Cassadó's most prolific periods, in the mid-1920s. It was dedicated to Francesco von Mendelssohn.

The Suite consists of three dance movements: 
 Preludio-Fantasia - a Zarabanda
 Sardana; and 
 Intermezzo e Danza Finale - a Jota.

The first movement quotes Zoltán Kodály's Sonata for Solo Cello, and the famous flute solo from Maurice Ravel's ballet Daphnis et Chloé.

This Suite was popularized by the great cellist János Starker.

References 

Compositions by Gaspar Cassadó
Solo cello pieces
Suites (music)